Gul Bahao is an environmental non-governmental organization based in Karachi, Sindh, Pakistan. It has received international recognition for its work on environmental research in the country. Along with its research activities, it has also provided practical solutions for low cost housing, water sanitation, and garbage disposal.

Garbage processing in Karachi 
Nargis Latif runs Gul Bahao which is situated in Karachi. The city produces 12,000 tonnes of garbage every day, that is why the Nargis Latif's team has established a recycling system there. They recycle garbage and create houses, water reservoirs and swimming pools out of it. Blocks created by Chandi technology are used for the construction of houses.

External links
 Gul Bahao

References 

Environmental organisations based in Pakistan
Environmental research
Organisations based in Karachi